Menudo is an album released by Menudo in 1985. This is the third time the group release a self-titled album, the first one was in 1981, which was also released under the title Fuego. The second one was Menudo's 17th album (second in English) released in 1985, featuring Charlie Massó, Roy Rosselló, Robby Rosa, Ricky Martin, and new member Raymond Acevedo. Raymond replaced Ray Reyes  after Ray had to be forced to leave the group because of the numerous fights and misunderstandings between his father and the group's manager.  According to Ray's brother, Raul Reyes, his brother's departure was anticipated. This album contains seven brand new songs plus three songs from their Evolución album translated into English. It also features their only song to reach the Billboard Hot 100: "Hold Me," which peaked at No. 62. A music video was released for this single. One of the band's most successful albums, Menudo features two members who went on to become highly successful international stars as solo artists: Ricky Martin and Robi Rosa.

Track listing
 Hold Me - Singer: Robby Rosa
 You And Me All The Way - Singer: Raymond Acevedo
 Come Home - Singer: Charlie Massó and Robby Rosa
 When I Dance With You (English version of "Yo Seré Tu Bailarín") - Singer: Charlie Massó
 Don't Hold Back - Singer: Robby Rosa
 Explosion - Singer: Robby Rosa
 Oh, My Love (English version of "Rayo De Luna") Singer: Ricky Martin
 Chocolate Candy (English version of "Sabes A Chocolate") - Singer: Robby Rosa
 Transformation - Singer: Roy Rosselló
 Please Be Good To Me - Singer: Robby Rosa
 Sing and Dance - Singer Robby Rosa

Charts

References

Menudo (band) albums
1985 albums